Henry Ezriel (c1910-1985) was a Kleinian analyst who pioneered group analysis at the Tavistock Clinic.

He is perhaps best known as the originator of one of the Malan triangles

Training and contributions
Having taken a medical degree from Vienna, Ezriel emigrated to England, to work post-war alongside W. R. Bion as consultant psychiatrist to the Tavistock.  There he developed his method of psychoanalytic group work, expounded in a series of articles in the fifties, and through his personal teaching thereafter. His non-directive approached centred on group tensions expressed in the here and now, and on transferences between members, and between members and the group.

Ezriel influentially proposed using what he called a “three part interpretation”, including the three key areas of adaptation, desire and anxiety. He highlighted the patient's required or conformist relationship to the group, which was seen as a defence against the wished-for relationship, a defence in turn driven by fear of an imagined catastrophic relationship. His associate David Malan would simplify Ezriel's formulations into his so-called 'triangle of conflict'.

Criticisms of Ezriel's approach included the way his minimalist interventions tended to promote an image of the omniscient therapist, as well as a feeling that individual patients were being neglected by comparison with the group as a whole. As one of his students I would like to state that he was the first to put order in my psychoanalytic thinking, both in individual as well as in group psychotherapy/psychoanalysis.  it sais at another place that he was a kleinian analyst. I know from Ezriel that he was not, that in his teaching he refused to talk about or hear of ideas that preceded Freud. I also do not accept the criticit against him about allianating.individual patients in his way of doing group therapy. To the best of his ability he included each individual's contribution to integrate the group interpretation. When I visited him for the last time, he had unfortunately suffered a stoke prevented him from enjoying the book by one of Israel's beterr painters I had brought him.

I later implemented and enlarged his teachings to include large groups and the psychoses

Dr. Rafael Springmann.

Selected writings
Ezriel, H. 'A Psycho-Analytic Approach to Group Treatment' British Journal of Medical Psychology, 23 (1950)

Ezriel, H. 'Notes on psychoanalytic Group therapy: II. Interpretation'  Research Psychiatry, 15 (1952)

See also

References

Further reading
Raphael Springmann, Psychotherapy: The Neglected Art (2002)

Springmann-Ribak R. Dialogues with Schizophrenia, The Art of Psychotherapy Fifth, revised edition, Wheatmark 2011

External links
 Discussion

1985 deaths
Group psychotherapists
Object relations theorists